Frank Nutzenberger (born 6 June 1959) is a Canadian gymnast. He competed in eight events at the 1984 Summer Olympics.

References

External links
 

1959 births
Living people
Canadian male artistic gymnasts
Olympic gymnasts of Canada
Gymnasts at the 1984 Summer Olympics
Gymnasts from Toronto